This article is a progressive and labeled list of the SI charge orders of magnitude, with certain examples appended to some list objects.

References 

Charge